Climbing Austrian Championships are the annual national championships in competition climbing organised by the Austrian Climbing Association (Österreichischen Wettkletterverband, ÖWK) since 2005. Since 2019, they also include the Olympic combined format.

Lead 
As of: December 2020

Men

Women

Boulder 
As of: December 2020

Men

Women

Speed 
As of: December 2020

Men

Women

Combined 
As of: December 2020

Men

Women

References 
 Official website of Austria Climbing (Kletterverband Österreich)
 Competition results

Climbing competitions